Elei Sinai (lit. Towards Sinai) was an Israeli settlement in the north of the Gaza Strip.

Founding
Elei Sinai was established in 1982 (Sukkot 5743) by a group who had been evicted from Yamit in the Sinai Peninsula. It was named for the yearning to return to the Sinai desert, where Yamit was located.

Avi Farhan, a Yamit expellee, and Arik Herfez, whose daughter had been killed by Palestinian militants, were two of the most notable residents.

Unilateral Disengagement

Among the arguments in opposition to Israel's unilateral disengagement plan, which stated that the settlers should be evicted from Elei Sinai, was a proposal by Farhan allowing the settlers to remain in their homes as Palestinian citizens, an idea the Palestinians the Israeli government rejected.

The residents had actually left their homes voluntarily but returned after realizing that the government had no place to send them. 

After the eviction, a group of fifty families established themselves at the Yad Mordechai junction as a protest that the government hadn't found a community solution for them. Others were sent to the Shirat HaYam hotel. The rest of the settlement later split into a few groups, including those now found in:

Karmia, who were promised future homes in Talmei Yafeh close to Ashkelon.
Or HaNer, who were promised future homes in the Bat Hadar neighborhood close to Ashkelon.

Farhan and a part of his family establish a new group and hope to establish a new community in the center of the country. The government agreed in 2006 to acclimatize this group in Palmachim.

References

Populated places established in 1982
Former Israeli settlements in the Gaza Strip
Villages depopulated during the Arab–Israeli conflict
1982 establishments in the Palestinian territories
2005 disestablishments in the Palestinian territories